Bretschneider is a German surname. Notable people with the surname include:

Andreas Bretschneider (born 1989), German artistic gymnast
Carl Anton Bretschneider (1808–1878), German mathematician
Bretschneider's formula, for the area of a quadrilateral
Emil Bretschneider (1833–1901), German sinologist
Frank Bretschneider (born 1956), German electronic musician
Heinrich Gottfried von Bretschneider (1739–1810), German satirical writer
Johann Michael Bretschneider (1680–1729), German painter
Karl Gottlieb Bretschneider (1776–1848), German scholar and theologian
Sylvia Bretschneider (1960–2019), German educator and politician

See also
Brettschneider, a variant spelling

German-language surnames